Hinton station is an Amtrak station in Hinton, West Virginia, served by the Cardinal. The station is a former Chesapeake and Ohio Railway depot, and is located in the Hinton Historic District. Constructed in 1892, the brick building includes wood canopies supported by heavy brackets featuring a wood-fan pattern trim.

A December 2007, fire damaged the building, but it reopened a short time later following repairs. The depot is currently undergoing a $1.5-million series of phased repairs and renovations. Work in the early phases included installation of a new slate roof, re-pointing of the brickwork and repairs to the windows and decorative woodwork. A new concrete platform with tactile edging was also installed.

Due to a bend in the adjacent New River, eastbound trains actually head southwest when passing the station (and vice versa).

References

External links

Hinton Amtrak Station at Train Web
Hinton Amtrak Station at UrbanUp

Amtrak stations in West Virginia
Buildings and structures in Summers County, West Virginia
Historic American Engineering Record in West Virginia
Historic district contributing properties in West Virginia
Railway stations in West Virginia
Stations along Chesapeake and Ohio Railway lines
Transportation in Summers County, West Virginia
National Register of Historic Places in Summers County, West Virginia
Railway stations in the United States opened in 1872
1872 establishments in West Virginia